

Charaxes phoebus is a butterfly in the family Nymphalidae. It is found in Ethiopia. The habitat consists of montane forests and woodland.

The larvae feed on Bersama abyssinica.

Description

Upperside
Front wings ferruginous, paler just beyond the middle, with a broad submarginal black band along the outer margin; apical part of submarginal edge intersected with black at the nervures; a triangular black spot, its base resting upon the first subcostal nervule near the apex; a black elongate spot closing the cell; two spots, one above the cell, the other halfway between the subapical spot and the end of the cell; two black spots placed obliquely just below the end of the cell. Hindwings as above, but without any spots, and with black marginal edge. Body ferruginous.

Underside
Reddish olivaceous, basal half curiously marked with silvery spots and streaks with dark centres; central band silvery, very narrow, tapering from the inner margin of hindwing near the anal angle to the front margin of anterior wing near the apex. Front wings with a submarginal row of eight dusky black spots between the nervules along the outer margin; a row of six dusky spots on the central band. Hindwings with a submarginal olivaceous band varied with silver; anal angle ochreous, enclosing a violaceous spot.

Hab. Abyssinia. B.M.

Related species
Historical attempts to assemble a cluster of presumably related species into a "Charaxes jasius Group" have not been wholly convincing. More recent taxonomic revision, corroborated by phylogenetic research, allow a more rational grouping congruent with cladistic relationships. Within a well-populated clade of 27 related species sharing a common ancestor approximately 16 mya during the Miocene, 26 are now considered together as The jasius Group.  One of the two lineages within this clade forms a robust monophyletic group of seven species sharing a common ancestor approximately 2-3 mya, i.e. during the Pliocene, and are considered as the jasius subgroup. The second lineage leads to 19 other species within the Jasius group, which are split in to three well-populated subgroups of closely related species.

The jasius Group (26 Species):

Clade 1: jasius subgroup (7 species)

Clade 2: contains the well-populated three additional subgroups (19 species) of the jasius Group: called the brutus, pollux, and eudoxus subgroups.

the pollux subgroup (4 species):
Charaxes pollux
Charaxes phoebus
Charaxes ansorgei
Charaxes dowsetti

Further exploration of the phylogenetic relationships amongst existing Charaxes taxa is required to improve clarity.

References

Victor Gurney Logan Van Someren, 1970 Revisional notes on African Charaxes (Lepidoptera: Nymphalidae). Part VI. Bulletin of the British Museum (Natural History) (Entomology)197-250.

External links
  Images of C. phoebus Royal Museum for Central Africa (Albertine Rift Project)
 Charaxes phoebus images at Consortium for the Barcode of Life

Butterflies described in 1866
phoebus
Endemic fauna of Ethiopia
Butterflies of Africa
Taxa named by Arthur Gardiner Butler